The Royden Baronetcy, of Frankby Hall in the County Palatine of Chester, is a title in the Baronetage of the United Kingdom. It was created on 29 July 1905 for Thomas Royden, head of Thomas Royden & Sons, shipowners. He also served as Lord Mayor of Liverpool and represented Toxteth West in the House of Commons as a Conservative. His eldest son, the second Baronet, was Chairman of the Cunard Line and sat as Member of Parliament for Bootle. On 28 January 1944 he was created Baron Royden, of Frankby in the County Palatine of Chester, in the Peerage of the United Kingdom. However, the peerage became extinct on his death in 1950 while he was succeeded in the baronetcy by his younger brother, the third Baronet.

Agnes Maude Royden was the youngest child of the first Baronet.

Royden baronets, of Frankby Hall (1905)
Sir Thomas Bland Royden, 1st Baronet (1831–1917)
Sir Thomas Royden, 2nd Baronet (1871–1950) (created Baron Royden in 1944)

Barons Royden (1944)
Thomas Royden, 1st Baron Royden (1871–1950)

Royden baronets, of Frankby Hall (1905; reverted)
Sir Ernest Bland Royden, 3rd Baronet (1873–1960)
Sir John Ledward Royden, 4th Baronet (1907–1976)
Sir Christopher John Royden, 5th Baronet (1937–2017)
Sir John Michael Joseph Royden, 6th Baronet (born 1965)

References

Kidd, Charles, Williamson, David (editors). Debrett's Peerage and Baronetage (1990 edition). New York: St Martin's Press, 1990.

History of Thomas Royden & Sons

Royden